The 1969 Maghreb Athletics Championships was the third edition of the international athletics competition between the countries of the Maghreb. Libya, Algeria, Tunisia and Morocco were the competing nations. Organised by the Union des Fédérations d'Athlétisme du Maghreb Uni (Union of Athletics Federations of the United Maghreb), it took place on 24 and 25 July in Tripoli, Libya. It was the first time that Libya competed at the competition. A total of 33 athletics events were contested, 22 for men and 11 for women.

The tournament was evenly contested, with Morocco topped the medal table with ten gold medals. Tunisia were a close second with nine golds, while Algeria and Libya each took seven gold medals. It was the last time that the 80 metres hurdles featured on the programme, being replaced by the international standard 100 metres hurdles from 1970 onwards. Morocco's Malika Hadky had a sprint triple, winning the 100, 200 and 400 metres events. Three men managed individual doubles: Mohammed Gammoudi won both long-distance races; Jadour Haddou was a double middle-distance champion; and Youcef Boulfelfel added a triple jump title to his pentathlon crown.

Medal summary

Men

Women

References

Champions
Les championnats maghrebins d athletisme. Union Sportive Oudja. Retrieved on 2015-02-20.

Maghreb Athletics Championships
Athletics competitions in Libya
Sport in Tripoli, Libya
Maghreb Athletics Championships
Maghreb Athletics Championships
20th century in Tripoli, Libya
International sports competitions hosted by Libya